Yervand and in some transliterations Ervand (in Western Armenian Yervant), is an Armenian given name of Persian origin. The Hellenic equivalent is Orontes.

Ervand / Yervand / Yervant may refer to:

Ervand
Ervand Abrahamian (born 1940) Marxist historian of Middle Eastern and particularly Iranian history
Ervand Kogbetliantz (1888–1974), Armenian/American mathematician and first president of the Yerevan State University

Orontes
Orontes I Sakavakyats (native Armenian name Yervand I Sakavakyats), king of the Orontid Dynasty, reigning in the period between 570 BC – 560 BC.
Orontes I (native Armenian name Yervand I), Orontid Dynasty king who reigned during the period between 401 BC – 344 BC
Orontes II (native Armenian name Yervand II), son of Orontes I, ruler of the Satrapy of Armenia
Orontes III (native Armenian name Yervand III), King of Armenia
Orontes IV (native Armenian name Yervand IV), son of King Arsames and founder of Yervandashat.

Yervand
Yervand Kochar (1899-1979), Armenian sculptor and artist
Yervand Krbachyan (born 1971), Armenian football player
Yervand Lalayan (1864-1931), Armenian ethnographer, archaeologist, folklorist
Yervand Manaryan (born 1924), Iranian-born Armenian actor
Yervand Sukiasyan (born 1967), Armenian football player
Yervand Zakharyan (born 1946), Armenian politician and the former mayor of Yerevan

Yervant
Yervant Aghaton (1860-1935), Armenian political figure, agronomist, publisher, writer, and one of the founding members of the Armenian General Benevolent Union
Yervant Gobelyan (1923-2010), Turkish Armenian poet and writer
Yervant Voskan, also known as Osgan Efendi (1855–1914), Ottoman Armenian painter, sculptor, instructor
Yervant Odian (1869-1926) Armenian satirist and writer
Yervant Zeitounlian (born 2004)

See also
Orontes (disambiguation)
Yervandashat (disambiguation)